Claire Summers is a Welsh news television presenter for BBC Wales.

Born in Cardiff, but brought up in Cowbridge, Summers was educated at Our Lady’s Convent in Cardiff. She then gained a BA degree at Aberystwyth University, and a post-graduate degree in journalism from the University of Cardiff.

Summers worked at Channel One television in Bristol, where she reported, filmed, edited and presented programmes. Summers joined BBC Wales in 2000. With Summers and Jason Mohammad the youngest members of the BBC Wales Today team, they were often asked to undertake the activity-based reports - such as in 2005, where Summers had to lead a Welsh Black cow called Ceridwen at the Royal Welsh Show. On 8 September 2008, Summers became chief sports presenter for Wales Today.

References

External links
 Summers at Current Buns
Radio Wales Breakfast with Claire Summers (BBC Radio Wales)

Year of birth missing (living people)
Living people
Journalists from Cardiff
Alumni of Aberystwyth University
Alumni of Cardiff University
BBC Cymru Wales newsreaders and journalists
People educated at Howell's School Llandaff
Welsh television journalists
BBC Radio Wales presenters